Haematococcaceae is a family of green algae in the order Chlamydomonadales.

See also
 Algaculture
 Astaxanthin

References

Chlorophyceae families
Chlamydomonadales